Turkey competed at the 1924 Summer Olympics in Paris, France.

Athletics

Twenty two athletes represented Turkey in 1924. It was the nation's second appearance in the sport.

Ranks given are within the heat.

Fencing

A single male fencer represented Turkey in 1924. It was the nation's debut in the sport.

 Men

Ranks given are within the pool.

Football

Turkey competed in the Olympic football tournament for the first time in 1924.

 Round 1

Final rank 17th

Weightlifting

Wrestling

Greco-Roman

 Men's

References
Official Olympic Reports

Nations at the 1924 Summer Olympics
1924
1924 in Turkish sport